Shekar Yazi (also Romanized Shekar Yāzī and Shakaryazī) is a village in Koreh Soni Rural District, in the Central District of Salmas County, West Azerbaijan Province, Iran. At the 2006 census, its population was 2,245, in 438 families.

References 

Populated places in Salmas County